The SNCAC NC.271 was a French experimental aircraft built by SNCAC in the late 1940s, as a 1:2.5 scale model of the proposed SNCAC NC.270 jet bomber, featuring swept-back wings, using SNCASE SE-161 Languedoc N0.31 F-BCUT as a launch platform.

Variants
NC.270 A proposed jet bomber, to have been powered by two Rolls-Royce Nene turbojet engines. Development was curtailed in June 1949 with the liquidation of the Aerocentre combine.
NC.271-01A 1:2.5 scale NC.270 glider research aircraft; first free flight on 28 January 1949.
NC.271-02 A powered version of the NC.271, fitted with a  Walter HWK 109-509A liquid-fuelled rocket engine; development was abandoned with the collapse of Aérocentre.

Specifications (NC.271-01)

References

Bibliography
 Buttler, Tony. X-Planes of Europe II: Military Prototype Aircraft from the Golden Age 1946–1974. Manchester, UK: Hikoki Publications, 2015. 
 

271
1940s French experimental aircraft
Aircraft first flown in 1949